Thomas Wright may refer to:

Entertainment
 Thomas Wright (writer) (fl. 1604), English writer
 Thomas Wright (engraver) (1792–1849), British engraver and portrait painter
 Thomas Wright (antiquarian) (1810–1877), British antiquarian and writer
 Thomas Wright (social commentator) (1839–1909), English social commentator
 Thomas J. Wright, film and television director, active since 1986
 Thomas Lee Wright, American writer and filmmaker
 Thomas M. Wright (born 1983), Australian actor/director

Politics
 Thomas Wright (Lord Mayor) (died 1798), Lord Mayor of London in 1785
 Thomas C. Wright (born 1948), American politician
 Thomas E. Wright (born 1955), North Carolina House of Representatives

Science
 Thomas Wright (astronomer) (1711–1786), English astronomer and mathematician
 Thomas Wright (geologist) (1809–1884), Scottish surgeon and paleontologist
 Thomas Wright (mathematical instrument maker) (1693-1767), English mathematical instrument maker
 Thomas H. Wright (1873–1928), American teacher and electrician

Sports
 Thomas Wright (cricketer, born 1842) (1842–?), English cricketer
 Thomas Wright (cricketer, born 1900) (1900–1962), English cricketer
 Thomas Wright (rugby) (1924–1990), Scottish rugby union and rugby league player

Other
 Thomas Wright (controversialist) (died 1624), English Roman Catholic priest and controversialist
 Thomas Wright (philanthropist) (1789–1875), British prison philanthropist
 Thomas Charles Wright (1799–?), Irish-born admiral, founding-father of Ecuadorian Navy
 Thomas Edward Wright, soldier and penal administrator, commandant at Norfolk Island 1827–28
 Thomas F. Wright (1830–1873), American Union Brevet brigadier general during Civil War
 Thomas Yates Wright (1869–1964), British planter, cricketer, and legislator in Ceylon

See also 
 Tom Wright (disambiguation)
 Tommy Wright (disambiguation)
 Wright